The Lone Peak Wilderness is a  wilderness area located within the Uinta and the Wasatch-Cache National Forest in the U.S. state of Utah.

The Lone Peak Wilderness was established in 1978 as part of the Endangered American Wilderness Act and was the only designated wilderness area in Utah until the enactment of the Utah Wilderness Act of 1984. Situated in the central Wasatch range on the Wasatch-Cache and Uinta National Forests, this wilderness is generally bounded on the north by Little Cottonwood Canyon, on the South by American Fork Canyon, on the west by the Salt Lake and Utah Valleys, and on the east by Twin Peaks.  Timpanogos Cave National Monument is adjacent to the south boundary of the Wilderness.

Geology
The geologic structure of the area is varied and complex, consisting of granitoid rock masses and several sedimentary formations. Carving of the present alpine topography is due to glaciation, with erosion being the current dominant force in the land sculpturing process. Much of the higher elevation is alpine, characterized by large, open cirque basins and exposed rocky ridges. A few small natural and reservoired lakes add to the scenic beauty.

Vegetation
Vegetation includes dense mountain brush mixed with sagebrush and grass. Patches of Douglas fir, subalpine fir, and aspen are common in isolated patches on north facing slopes. Snow remains in some areas until mid-summer.

Restrictions
To preserve and protect the physical and aesthetic environment, National Forest wildernesses are closed to motor vehicles, motorized equipment, hang gliders, and bicycles. In addition, parts of this wilderness lay within the culinary watershed for Salt Lake County, and special restrictions concerning camping, swimming, and domestic animals apply.

The following acts are prohibited in the Lone Peak Wilderness Area:
 Group sizes exceeding 10 persons for overnight use
 Camping within  of lakes, trails, or other sources of water
 Camping for a period of 3 days at an individual site
 Short-cutting a trail switchback, and
 Disposing of garbage, debris, or other waste.

Additionally, open fires are not allowed in the Red Pine Lake, Red Pine Fork, and Maybird Gulch drainages within the Wilderness.

Trails
Trails are easy to follow but may cross extremely rough terrain at high elevations. Usage of the area is light to moderate, heaviest on weekends and during hunting seasons.

Weather
Summer temperatures can range from near  in the daytime to below  at night. Occasional summer thundershowers can be expected.

See also
 Wilderness Act
 National Wilderness Preservation System
 List of U.S. Wilderness Areas

References

 Lynna P. Howard, Utah's Wilderness Areas: The Complete Guide (Westcliffe Publishers, 2005) 
 Bill Cunningham & Polly Burke, Wild Utah: A Guide to 45 Roadless Recreation Areas (Falcon Publishing, 1998) 
 U.S. Forest Service map, Lone Peak & Mt. Timpanogos Wildernesses (U.S. Forest Service, 2004)

External links

 Wilderness.net - Lone Peak Wilderness
 Wasatch-Cache National Forest - Lone Peak Wilderness
 Google Maps satellite view

Protected areas of Salt Lake County, Utah
Protected areas of Utah County, Utah
Wilderness areas of Utah
Wasatch-Cache National Forest
Wasatch Range
Uinta National Forest
Protected areas established in 1978
1978 establishments in Utah